This is a list of members of the Victorian Legislative Council between 1976 and 1979. As half of the Legislative Council's terms expired at each triennial election, half of these members were elected at the 1973 state election with terms expiring in 1979, while the other half were elected at the 1976 state election with terms expiring in 1982.

The 1975 redistribution, which created four new seats in Greater Melbourne and abolished one (Northern Province) in the country, came into effect during the term.

  On 6 August 1976, John Tripovich, Labor MLC for Doutta Galla, died. Labor candidate David White won the resulting by-election on 16 October 1976.
  In April 1978, Keith Bradbury, National (Country) MLC for North Eastern, resigned. National candidate Bill Baxter won the resulting by-election on 24 June 1978.
  In August 1978, Vance Dickie, Liberal MLC for Ballarat, resigned. Labor candidate David Williams won the resulting by-election on 28 October 1978.

Sources
 Re-member (a database of all Victorian MPs since 1851). Parliament of Victoria.

Members of the Parliament of Victoria by term
20th-century Australian politicians